The Group of European Progressive Democrats was a heterogeneous political group with seats in the European Parliament between 1973 and 1984. It was mostly composed of French Gaullists and Irish Fianna Fáil.

History
The Gaullists had split from the Liberal Group on 21 January 1965, creating a new Group called the "European Democratic Union". The Group was renamed on 16 January 1973 as the "Group of European Progressive Democrats" when the Gaullists were joined by the Irish Fianna Fáil until 24 July 1984 when they became the "Group of the European Democratic Alliance".

The group was never a close alliance. In 1973, the only common platform was on the issues of regionalism, social policy and the Common Agricultural Policy. Fianna Fáil, an Irish nationalist party, was reluctant to identify too closely with the Gaullists, who also had an alliance with the Conservative Party of the United Kingdom at the time.

MEPs at 17 July 1979

Sources
Konrad-Adenauer-Stiftung
"Political Data Handbook: OECD Countries", Jan-Erik Lane, David McKay, Kenneth Newton 1997
Europe Politique
European Parliament MEP Archives
Centre Virtuel de la Connaissance sur l'Europe (CVCE) via European NAvigator
Danish Demographic Database, part of the Danish State Archives
1999 Election website for Jan Sturm, a candidate for the June Movement
Website of the Danish June Movement 
Website of the Danish Progress Party

References

Former European Parliament party groups
Conservatism in Europe